The Golden Louis is a 1909 American drama film written by Edward Acker, directed by D. W. Griffith, and produced by the Biograph Company in New York City. Originally, this short was distributed to theaters on a "split reel", accompanying another Griffith-directed film, the comedy The Politician's Love Story.

Plot
On a snowy holiday evening, an old woman sends a small girl begging for money along the streets of late 17th-century "old Paris". Well-dressed revelers and others passing by the child ignore her pleas for charity. Exhausted and cold, the little beggar lies down on some stone steps next to the sidewalk and falls asleep. Soon, one gentleman walking by takes pity on her, although he does not wake the girl. He simply places a coin, a gold "Louis d'or", into one of her wooden shoes, which has come off her foot and sits on the snow-covered pavement next to her. Elsewhere, inside a nearby gambling hall, one of the revelers has run out of cash playing "roulettes". Confident that he can win a fortune playing the game if he only had more money, he goes outside to find more funds. There he sees the girl asleep on the steps. He also spies the gold Louis in her shoe. Reluctant at first to take the coin, the young man "borrows" it, for he is certain he can win a fortune for himself and her at roulette. While he returns to the gambling hall and resumes playing, the child awakes and renews her wandering and begging along the streets. The gambler wins his expected fortune and now goes back to share his success with the girl. During his search for her, the weak, half-frozen little beggar returns to the steps and lies down once more. The gambler eventually finds her. She appears to be sleeping again, but he quickly realizes that the child is dead. Devastated, the gambler cries, rages at a crowd of onlookers, and then throws his roulette winnings into the snow. He then picks up the small lifeless body, cradles it in his arms, and continues sobbing.

Cast

 Anita Hendrie as the mother or old woman
 Adele DeGarde as child
 Owen Moore as Good Samaritan, the donor of coin
 Charles Inslee as main gambler
 Herbert Yost as fellow gambler and reveler
 Mack Sennett as fellow gambler and reveler
 Arthur V. Johnson as fellow gambler
 Linda Arvidson as reveler
 George Gebhardt as reveler
 Marion Leonard as reveler
 Dorothy West as reveler
 Florence Lawrence as onlooker
 Wilfred Lucas as onlooker
 Kate Bruce as onlooker
 Gladys Egan as onlooker

Production
D. W. Griffith is often credited with writing this short, but freelance screenwriter Edward Acker is identified in silent-era publications as the actual "scenarist". In a profile on Acker's screenwriting career, the New York-based trade journal The Moving Picture World reports in its September 30, 1916 issue:

While there is no evidence that Acker based his scenario on Hans Christian Andersen's tragic tale "The Little Match Girl", some film historians have noted that the plight and fate of the beggar child dying in the snow bear similarities to the plot in the Danish poet's famous short story, which was first published in 1845.

Filming
The short was filmed over two daysJanuary 28–29, 1909inside Biograph's New York studio at 11 East, 14th Street in Manhattan. Although some motion-picture  sources cite nearby Bleecker Street as a secondary site for filming on location, no outdoor footage is included in surviving copies of the short. All scenes in the drama appear to be performed on interior corner sets, which would have been assembled at Biograph's 14th Street facilities.

Costuming and the roulette anachronism
During his long career as a director, D. W. Griffith gained a reputation among motion-picture crews, performers, and film reviewers for his efforts in making the costumes and sets in his productions as historically accurate as possible, whether in his sweeping epics such as The Birth of a Nation (1915) and Intolerance (1916) or in his far less elaborate screen projects. The Golden Louis, among his most modest "photoplays", provides insight into the challenges Griffith faced while working in the formative years of his career and within a young American film industry characterized largely by sparse production budgets, exceedingly tight filming schedules, and very limited choices for set designs and costumes.

With regard to this production's costumes, the actors' wigs, hats, waistcoats, capes, breeches, and other wardrobe elements visually cast the story in approximately 1650 France. Film historian Bernard Hanson in his article "D. W. Griffith: Some Sources", published in the December 1972 issue of The Art Bulletin, states that it appears there was no "systematic research" by Griffith in this early, small project to portray a specific, historically accurate time period with the costumes and sets. Instead, it was likely that the director's intention in The Golden Louis was simply to convey a general impression of Old Paris to theater audiences, one that could be interpreted as being set within a very broad timeframe, somewhere in the 17th or even 18th centuries.

Many moviegoers in 1908 may have cared little about the actual historical accuracy of the sets and costumes in the films they viewed; nevertheless, period costumes and furnishings can often, as in the case of The Golden Louis, create anachronisms in historical portrayals, items that can either be subtly or glaringly misplaced in time. The game of roulette featured in this short and mentioned in plot descriptions in 1908 film publications is one such anachronism. The table game as presented in the film was not developed in France until well into the 1700s, when it was adapted from an Italian numbers game called biribi. After a series of modifications and innovations, roulette achieved its present layout and wheel structure about 1790, roughly 140 years after the costume styles featured in The Golden Louis.

Release and reception
Given the brevity of this drama, with a film length of just 474 feet and an original runtime of  approximately seven minutes, it was released and distributed by Biograph on a single 1000-foot split reel, which was a standard reel sent to theaters that held two or more entirely separate motion pictures. The Golden Louis on its reel accompanied another slightly longer Griffith-directed film, the 526-foot comedy The Politician's Love Story.

In the March 1909 issue of The Nickelodeon, the Chicago trade publication's reviewer H. A. Downey summarizes the film as fundamentally a morality lesson that portrays "the fallacy of good intentions".

Notes

References

See also
 D. W. Griffith filmography

External links
 
The Golden Louis; allmovie listing
The Golden Louis available for free download at Internet Archive

1909 films
Silent American drama films
American black-and-white films
American silent short films
Films directed by D. W. Griffith
1909 drama films
1909 short films
Articles containing video clips
Beggars
Charity
Fictional child deaths
Surviving American silent films
1900s English-language films
1900s American films